William Joseph Wynn (June 12, 1860 – January 4, 1935) was a machinist and U.S. Representative from California for one term from 1903 to 1905.

Biography 
Born to Irish parents in San Francisco, California, Wynn attended the public schools of San Francisco. He was an apprentice in the machinist's trade and subsequently worked in the principal manufacturing establishments of San Francisco. He then served as member of the board of supervisors of the city and county of San Francisco from January 8, 1902, to March 4, 1903.

Congress 
Wynn was elected as a Democrat to the Fifty-eighth Congress (March 4, 1903 – March 3, 1905). He was an unsuccessful candidate for re-election in 1904 to the Fifty-ninth Congress, losing to Republican Everis A. Hayes.

Later career and death 
He then worked in the insurance business in San Francisco until his death on January 4, 1935. He is interred at Holy Cross Cemetery in Colma, California.

References 

1860 births
1935 deaths
Burials at Holy Cross Cemetery (Colma, California)
Machinists
Democratic Party members of the United States House of Representatives from California